The 2022 Norwegian Football Cup Final was the final match of the 2021–22 Norwegian Football Cup, the 115th season of the Norwegian Football Cup, the premier Norwegian football cup competition organized by the Norwegian Football Federation (NFF). The match was played on 1 May 2022 at the Ullevaal Stadion in Oslo, and opposed two Eliteserien sides, Bodø/Glimt and Molde.

Molde defeated Bodø/Glimt 1–0 to claim the Norwegian Cup for the fifth time in their history, the first time since 2014. Sivert Mannsverk scored the winning goal, a penalty after 76 minutes.

Route to the final

Note: In all results below, the score of the finalist is given first.

Key:

ES = Eliteserien team
D1 = 1. divisjon team
D2 = 2. divisjon team
D3 = 3. divisjon team

H = Home
A = Away
a.e.t. = After extra time

Match

Details

References

2022
FK Bodø/Glimt matches
Molde FK matches
Football Cup
Sports competitions in Oslo
Norwegian Football Cup